George McCorquodale (10 May 1817-1895) was an English printer who founded the McCorquodale Group, once one of the UK's largest printing companies.

Career
McCorquodale was the son of Hugh McCorquodale and Lucia Hall. He started his printing career in Liverpool, opening a stationers shop, Liverpool Printing and Stationery Co. Ltd, in 1841, then founding McCorquodale & Co Ltd in Newton-le-Willows in 1846, taking over and converting the former South Lancashire Conservative Association Hall. The company became well-known as a printer for the rail industry, producing many British railway companies' tickets, timetables, posters and other printed work. During the 1870s, McCorquodale opened further factories in Glasgow, London and Leeds. In 1878, Sir Richard Moon, chairman of the London and North Western Railway invited McCorquodale to build a printing works in the railway town of Wolverton. This specialised in printing registered envelopes later diversified into books and commercial stationery.

He held the office of High Sheriff of Lancashire in 1882, and High Sheriff of Anglesey in 1889, living in retirement at Gadlys in Anglesey.

Family
McCorquodale married, firstly, Louisa Kate Honan, daughter of Frederick Honan, on 24 December 1844, and lived for a time in a large house (demolished in the 1930s) in what is today Newton-le-Willows' Willow Park.

After his first wife died in 1870, he married, secondly, Emily Sanderson, daughter of Reverend Thomas Sanderson and Eliza Baddeley, on 1 January 1872 at Southover Church, Lewes in Sussex.

When McCorquodale died in 1895 he left an estate valued at £439,396 (about £48 million in today's terms).

References

1817 births
1895 deaths
George
People from Newton-le-Willows
19th-century printers